Peter White  may refer to:

Arts and entertainment
 Peter White (actor) (born 1937), American actor
 Peter White (broadcaster) (born 1947), British broadcast journalist and radio presenter
 Peter White (musician) (born 1954), British smooth jazz guitarist
 Peter White (professor)  (born 1947), professor of Classical Languages and Literature at the University of Chicago
 Peter Gilbert White (1937–2007), English cathedral organist, who served in Leicester Cathedral
 Peter V. White, American film editor
 Peter White (St. Elsewhere), a character on the 1980s hospital drama St. Elsewhere
 Pete White (The Venture Bros.), a character on the animated television series The Venture Bros.

Politics
 Peter White (Australian politician) (1936–2005), member of the Australian House of Representatives
 Peter White (Canadian politician) (1838–1906), Canadian parliamentarian
 Peter White (Michigan politician) (1830–1908), American businessman and philanthropist from Marquette, Michigan
 Peter White (Queensland politician), Member of the Queensland Legislative Assembly, Australia
 Peter J. White, Senior Policy Advisor to President Trump

Sports
 Peter White (footballer) (1970–1996), Australian rules footballer
 Peter White (ice hockey) (born 1969), retired Canadian professional ice hockey player

Other
 Peter White (professor), professor of Classic Languages and Literature at the University of Chicago
 Peter White (Royal Navy officer) (1919–2010)

See also
Peter Wight (disambiguation)